Shannon Latham is an American politician serving as a member of the Iowa House of Representatives from the 55th district. Elected in November 2020, she assumed office on January 11, 2021.

Education 
Latham earned a Bachelor of Science degree in agricultural journalism, public service, and administration in agriculture from Iowa State University and a Master of Business Administration from the University of Iowa.

Career 
Latham began her career as a lobbyist, eventually working as director of legislative affairs for the Agribusiness Association of Iowa. She later served as the agriculture program coordinator for the Iowa Department of Agriculture and Land Stewardship. Latham has also worked as a public relations specialist for Meyocks & Priebe Advertising. In 2018, Latham ran for 27th district in the Iowa Senate, losing narrowly to Amanda Ragan. Latham was elected to the Iowa House of Representatives in November 2020 and assumed office in January 2021. She is vice chair of the House Appropriations Committee.

Personal life 
Latham is married to John Latham, the nephew of former Congressman Tom Latham.

References 

Living people
Iowa State University alumni
University of Iowa alumni
Republican Party members of the Iowa House of Representatives
Women state legislators in Iowa
Year of birth missing (living people)
21st-century American women